Carlos M. García Zambrana (born August 22, 1983) is minority spokesman for the Puerto Rican Independence Party as an elected official for the San Germán, Puerto Rico municipal assembly.

Aside from García's responsibilities with the municipal assembly, he currently serves as Vice President for the New Life Christian Academy, while also working as a legal aide and running his family's farm.

In 2012, García ran as the Puerto Rican Independence Party candidate for mayor of San Germán, Puerto Rico.

References

1983 births
Living people
Puerto Rico Independence Party politicians
Puerto Rican farmers
21st-century Puerto Rican people